Robert Hugo, Duke of Parma and Piacenza (Italian: Roberto Ugo di Borbone-Parma; 7 August 1909 – 15 November 1974) was the head of the House of Bourbon-Parma and the pretender to the defunct throne of the Duchy of Parma between 1959 and 1974.

Life
Robert Hugo was born at Schloss Weilburg in Baden bei Wien, the second but eldest surviving son of Elias, Duke of Parma and Archduchess Maria Anna of Austria (1882–1940). He succeeded his father Elias as head of the House of Bourbon-Parma upon his death in 1959, and maintained his style until his death in 1974 in Vienna. He died unmarried and without issue, and was succeeded by his agnatic half-uncle Xavier.

Honours
  Calabrian House of Bourbon-Two Sicilies Knight Grand Cross of Justice of the Calabrian Two Sicilian Order of Saint George.

Ancestry

See also
Duchy of Parma
House of Bourbon-Parma

References

 

  

Pretenders to the throne of Parma
Princes of Parma and Piacenza
Princes of Bourbon-Parma
House of Bourbon-Parma
Knights of the Golden Fleece of Spain
1909 births
1974 deaths